R-13 regional road is a Montenegrin roadway.

Section from Bioče to Mateševo is a parallel road to section of Bar–Boljare motorway that was finished in 2022. When this section of Bar–Boljare motorway was finished, R-13 regional road section from Mateševo to Kolašin would serve as a major connection from motorway to the  highway.

History

The M-9 highway was officially opened for traffic in 1984. It was built as part of the larger M-9 highway within the Yugoslav highway network, spanning Montenegro, Kosovo and Serbia. It connected Kolašin and Andrijevica with Peć and Priština in Kosovo, and Leskovac and Pirot in Serbia.

The M-9 highway originally flowed through the city of Kolašin to connect it to the M-2 highway. A bypass was built via the Vladoš Bridge to merge the M-9 with the M-2. On 27 March 2014, the Ministry of Transport and Maritime Affairs officially realigned the M-9 highway to its current alignment, incorporating the Vladoš Bridge, while downgrading the M-9's former path through Kolašin as a municipal road.

In January 2016, the Ministry of Transport and Maritime Affairs published bylaw on categorisation of state roads. With new categorisation, R-13 regional road was created from previous R-19 regional road and section of previous M-9 highway from Mateševo to Kolašin.

Major intersections

References

R-13